Kaniel Dickens (born July 21, 1978) is an American former professional basketball player. He was selected by the Utah Jazz in the second round (50th pick overall) in the 2000 NBA draft.

College career
Dickens first played college basketball for Barton Junior College and then Tyler Junior College.  He ended his college career by playing two seasons at the University of Idaho.  At Idaho, Dickens averaged 9.3 points and 5.7 rebounds.

Professional career
In addition to being drafted 50th overall by the Jazz, Dickens was drafted 42nd by the Idaho Stampede of the Continental Basketball Association and 21st by the Las Vegas Silver Bandits of the International Basketball League.  Dickens played the 2000–01 season for Ural Great in Russia.

Dickens was signed as a free agent by the Portland Trail Blazers on December 19, 2003, and appeared in 3 games for them during the 2003–04 season. He signed a 10-day contract with the New Jersey Nets on 01/05/2005 and saw action in 11 games.

2007–08 season
Dickens began the 2007–2008 season with the Colorado 14ers of the NBDL.  In 29 games (28 starts), prior to his NBA callup, Dickens averaged a team high 20.4 points and 5.2 rebounds.  Dickens was selected to play in the 2008 D-League All-Star Game.

On February 22, 2008, Dickens was signed to a ten-day contract with the Cleveland Cavaliers so they would have enough players to face the Washington Wizards that night, due to a depleted roster because of a blockbuster trade the day prior.  Dickens saw his first action as a Cavalier on that very night, logging seven minutes with one rebound and a blocked shot.

On March 3, 2008, the Cavaliers signed Dickens to a second ten-day contract. His contract expired on March 13, 2008, allowing Dickens to become a free agent. Dicken's final NBA game was played on March 6, 2008, in a 96 - 107 loss to the Chicago Bulls. In his final game, Dickens recorded only 2 points and no other stats.

In August 2008 he signed with Italian club S.S. Basket Napoli. He was waived in September and signed with Pallacanestro Varese later that month.

In August 2009 he signed a contract with the French Pro A team SLUC Nancy.

For the 2011 New Zealand NBL season, Dickens signed with the Southland Sharks.

References

External links
 NBA.com: Kaniel Dickens Info Page

1978 births
Living people
American expatriate basketball people in China
American expatriate basketball people in France
American expatriate basketball people in Italy
American expatriate basketball people in New Zealand
American expatriate basketball people in Portugal
American expatriate basketball people in Russia
American expatriate basketball people in Spain
American expatriate basketball people in Ukraine
American men's basketball players
Basketball players from Denver
BC Cherkaski Mavpy players
Cleveland Cavaliers players
Colorado 14ers players
Dakota Wizards (CBA) players
Fayetteville Patriots players
Harlem Globetrotters players
Idaho Vandals men's basketball players
Joventut Badalona players
Liga ACB players
Mobile Revelers players
New Jersey Nets players
Pallacanestro Varese players
PBC Ural Great players
Portland Trail Blazers players
Power forwards (basketball)
Small forwards
SLUC Nancy Basket players
Tyler Apaches men's basketball players
Utah Jazz draft picks